Yucatán is a 2018 Spanish comedy film co-written and directed by Daniel Monzón. The film is about a group of scammers who embark in a cruise ship in order to defraud and steal the money of an old baker who recently won millions of euros in the lottery and is travelling on the ship with his family. Yucatán was mostly filmed onboard Pullmantur Cruises's MS Sovereign and on location in the ports where the ship docked during its route.

Plot
Clayderman (Rodrigo de la Serna) is a con man who, together with his wife Verónica (Stephanie Cayo), works on board the MS Sovereign as a pianist. He uses his position as a crew member to commit petty crimes against the passengers. In Barcelona, Lucas (another scammer) discreetly enters the ship disguised as a crew member. Almost at the same time, Antonio and his family come on board as regular passengers. Clayderman, Lucas, and Verónica have a past together when they used to "work" as a group, but they split up when both Clayderman and Lucas fell in love with Verónica.

As soon as Clayderman finds out that Lucas is on board, he is sure that his old friend is planning a new scam. He starts to investigate and finds that Antonio, an old baker who recently won 161 million euros in the lottery, is on board with his family. From this moment on, Clayderman, Lucas, and Verónica (assisted by their allies) start a competition to see who can defraud and steal the old man's money first.

Cast
 Luis Tosar as Lucas
 Rodrigo de la Serna as Clayderman
 Joan Pera as Antonio
 Stephanie Cayo as Verónica
 Gloria Muñoz as Carmen
 Alicia Fernández as Leticia
 Adrián Núñez as Brendon
 Txell Aixendri as Alicia

Production
Most of Yucatán scenes are set onboard Pullmantur Cruises's MS Sovereign cruise ship. The film was shot on board the ship during a transatlantic crossing from Brazil to Spain. The actors and the crew embarked on April 10, 2016, in Recife and spent 22 days shooting the film, disembarking in Barcelona. The team was composed of about 100 people who lived aboard the ship during this time. While filming was taking place the ship was performing its regular route with passengers; the crew and passengers became part of the film and even acted as extras in some scenes.

Release

Box office
Yucatán was released in Spain on August 31, 2018. In its opening weekend, the film grossed $1,240,253, finishing number one in the Spanish box office. In its second weekend, the film grossed $1,071,148 and dropped to the second position in the box office. After seven weeks, Yucatán grossed more than $5.8 million only in the Spanish territory, becoming the seventh-highest-grossing film in Spain in 2018.

Reception
 of El País wrote: "I think I understand what Daniel Monzón has proposed, but the result seems devastating. Nothing works in this weary plot, null of grace, with interpretations that move between the inane and the grotesque". Xavi Sánchez Pons from the website "Sensacine" did not like the film either, giving it two out of five stars with the explanation: "In Yucatan, all of the comedic gags are forced and lack any kind of surprise effect". Sergio F. Pinilla of Cinemanía liked the film, giving it four out of five stars and commenting: "With non-stop fun, there's the glamour of the musical, the absurdity of romantic comedies, [intrigue] and even animated cartoon slapstick in Yucatán". Noel Murray of Los Angeles Times wrote: "From the exotic ports of call to the occasional musical numbers, “Yucatán” is a mostly enjoyable ride. It's meant to be a throwback to glamorous old Hollywood movies.". Jordan Hoffman of TV Guide wrote: "It's virtually impossible not to be amused by this picture. Like the limitless buffet and late show with dancing girls, it's a simple pleasure, but one with guaranteed success." Sergi Sánchez of Fotogramas gives the film four out of five stars and comments: "[Daniel Monzón] has an infinite affection, not condescension, for his characters and a remarkable empathy for the lights and shadows of the human condition".

Yucatán was nominated for one Gaudí Award in the category of "Best Production Manager (Millor Direcció de Producció)".

See also 
 List of Spanish films of 2018

References

External links
 
 

2018 comedy films
Spanish comedy films
Films set on ships
Films shot in Recife
2010s Spanish-language films
Telecinco Cinema films
Ikiru Films films
2010s Spanish films
Buena Vista International films